Time Cat  is a children's fantasy novel by Lloyd Alexander, first published in 1963.
It was his first children's fantasy.

Origins

Alexander succeeded on his first try writing fantasy for children, which he later called "the most creative and liberating experience of my life." The book was Time Cat (1963), 
a fantasy inspired by one of his pet cats, Solomon. Solomon would visit the office while Alexander was working, but the author would never see him come or go. He recalled in 1999:
I began to have a private joke, playing a game as it were, pretending that he could somehow appear and disappear whenever he wanted to. ... If a cat has nine lives, maybe he's gone off to visit one of his nine lives. At that moment, it suddenly occurred to me – this sounds like an idea for a whole book. Each chapter would be one of his nine lives. I didn't give him a credit in the book. But I should have, even though he didn't do any work.

The nine settings were "nine places in the past that a cat would logically visit", discovered by reading and research.

Plot summary
Jason learns that his cat, Gareth, is able to talk and has the power to travel to nine different points in world history (his "nine lives"). Jason convinces Gareth to take him along and their adventures begin where cats are considered divine, in Ancient Egypt in the year 2700 BC.

Subsequently, they visit Rome, where they are taken in by the Old Cats of Caesar.  There, they are kidnapped to a village where Cerdric Longtooth, the chieftain of the village tries to burn him but his wife objects. Later on, the villagers find out about Gareth. They refer to Gareth as a "Catamountain."  Jason takes this opportunity to pretend to be the beholder of the supposedly Ferocious beast.  They later on become friends with the village and leave after another catamountain arrives.  This time, with kittens. Later, they visit the United Kingdom (55 BC), Ireland (AD 411), Japan (998), Italy (1468), Peru (1555), the Isle of Man (1588), Germany (1600), and the United States (1775).

After nine episodes they return home. Gareth says he will never again speak to Jason, and he forbids Jason ever to mention their travels to anyone. It is not difficult for Jason to obey, since he doubts that anyone would believe his story. However, he has acquired an ankh pendant as a memento and he uses it to communicate with Gareth without talking.

Notes

References

External links

1963 American novels
Children's fantasy novels
Novels by Lloyd Alexander
Henry Holt and Company books
Children's novels about animals
Novels about cats
Novels about time travel
1963 children's books